Henry William Massingham (25 May 1860 – 27 August 1924) was an English journalist, editor of The Nation from 1907 to 1923. In his time it was considered the leading British Radical weekly.

Life
He joined London paper The Star in 1888, and was promoted to editor in 1890. In 1888 as deputy editor to T. P. O'Connor he had given George Bernard Shaw his break in journalism, appointing him deputy drama critic to Belfort Bax.

He edited the Daily Chronicle 1897–1899, but in November 1899 was forced out because his editorial line on the Second Boer War was hostile to the government.

His departure from The Nation was a matter of party politics: he had broken from the Liberals under David Lloyd George, in favour of the Labour Party. A change of ownership was putting control in the hands of John Maynard Keynes, a Liberal. In July 1914, with the threat of war and refusal of the government to deny the possibility of British involvement, Massingham and H. N. Brailsford voiced their opposition to intervention in The Nation as did other Liberals in the Manchester Guardian, The Economist, and Daily News.

Massingham during the short remainder of his life was a columnist, in the Christian Science Monitor and The Spectator.

Family
Massingham married Emma Jane Snowdon by whom he had his family. After her death he married her sister Ellen Snowdon. They were two of the daughters of Henry Snowdon of St. Leonards Priory in Norwich.

Massingham was also the father of Dr. Richard Massingham who became well known for his direction of public information films at about the time of World War II. The writer Harold J. Massingham was another son, and the playwright and actress Dorothy Massingham was his daughter.

References

Further reading
Why We Came to Help Belgium, online text
H. W. M.: A selection from the writings of H. W. Massingham (1925)
 Alfred F. Havighurst (1974), Radical Journalist: H.W. Massingham, 1860-1924

External links
 
Spartacus page
 

1860 births
1924 deaths
English male journalists
Members of the Fabian Society
People educated at Norwich School
English male non-fiction writers
World War I